Wairere Falls, the highest waterfall in New Zealand's North Island, plunges 153 metres (500 feet) in two steps over the Kaimai escarpment.

The waterfall is located between Te Aroha and Matamata. A walking track runs from the car park at the end of Goodwin Road, up the valley of the stream to a viewing platform, and thence to the top of the plateau and the crest of the falls. Once at the top one can continue onto the North South track that runs the length of the Kaimai Ranges.

The Wairere Falls receives around 60,000 visitors each year.  In 2017, the farmer who owned land close to the falls closed off a paddock to stock and constructed a seat for visitors that he dubbed "The international seat of peace".

References

External links
Wairere Falls Track, Department of Conservation
Flickr set of the hike to the falls

Waterfalls of Waikato
Ngāti Hinerangi